Stim may refer to:

STIM (Svenska Tonsättares Internationella Musikbyrå), Swedish Performing Rights Society 
Stimming, repetitive self-stimulating behavior, often observed in people who have Asperger's syndrome or autism
Stim an autoinjector carrying drugs for emergency use. A common types contains Epinephrine called EpiPen. Other drugs maybe contained for different medical emergencies.

See also
Stimulus (physiology), a detectable change in the internal or external environment
Stimulation, the action of various agents (stimuli) on muscles, nerves, or a sensory end organ
Stimulant, a drug or other substance that temporarily increases alertness and wakefulness
Caffeine